Red is the seventh studio album by English progressive rock band King Crimson. It was released on 6 October 1974 through Island Records in the United Kingdom and Atlantic Records in North America and Japan. The album was recorded at Olympic Studios in London in July and August 1974, and produced by the band themselves. The track "Providence" was a free improvisation recorded at their 30 June 1974 concert at the Palace Theater in the city of the same name. Parts of some of the pieces were conceived during previous improvisations performed by the band live. "Starless" was originally considered for their previous album, Starless and Bible Black (1974), but was deemed incomplete at the time. The lengthy version included on this album was refined and performed during concerts throughout 1974.

Red is a progressive rock album with a noticeably heavier sound than their previous albums; it was later called one of the 50 "heaviest albums of all time" by Q. This was achieved with the performances of just three band members: guitarist Robert Fripp, bassist and vocalist John Wetton and drummer Bill Bruford. The dense sound of the album was created by use of significant layering, multiple guitar overdubs, and key guest appearances by musicians including founding King Crimson member Ian McDonald, classical oboist Robin Miller and English jazz trumpeter Mark Charig.

Roughly two weeks prior to the release of Red, King Crimson disbanded. The album turned out to be their lowest-charting album at that time, spending only one week in the UK Albums Chart at No. 45 and the US Billboard 200 at No. 66. However, it was well received among fans and critics. It has received further praise retrospectively, being recognized as one of the band's best works, and has been re-issued many times.

Background and recording 
Near the conclusion of King Crimson's 1974 US and Canada tour, the decision was made to ask David Cross to leave the band. EG, the band's management, urged Fripp not to tell Cross until after the final date of the tour, but he would not be able to do this anyway as Fripp would not return from the US until after Cross would return to Europe. So Fripp agreed that EG management would tell Cross, "on proviso that [Cross] was told that I objected to not telling him personally." Instead EG failed to inform Cross at all, waiting until 7 July, the day before the recording of Red began.

Red was recorded in studio 2 of Olympic Studios in Barnes, London. The band reunited with recording engineer George Chkiantz, who had previously worked with them on Starless and Bible Black. Chkiantz remembered Fripp placing himself and his guitar amplifier in the drummer's booth, "sitting on a stool with the light off, quite possibly with the door pulled to, basically playing when the stuff was counted in." Once Bruford was no longer needed in the studio he cycled home, leaving Wetton and Chkiantz to record the vocals. With the backing tracks put down, the band brought back several contributors to past albums in Cross's stead: Robin Miller on oboe, Mark Charig on cornet, former King Crimson members Ian McDonald and Mel Collins on saxophones, as well as uncredited players on cello and double bass.

Red sees King Crimson follow in the direction established by their previous two albums, Larks' Tongues in Aspic (1973) and Starless and Bible Black (1974), but in contrast to those albums, Red features more layered production with multiple overdubs, as well as the return of the earlier instrumentation of the guest players. Reds heavier tone was largely due to the influence of the rhythm section of Wetton and Bruford, whom Fripp has referred to as "a flying brick wall". During the recording of the album Fripp, increasingly unsure of the group's direction, took a "backseat" when making large decisions, leaving Wetton and Bruford to call the shots over the final content. Wetton and Bruford believed Fripp was merely "pulling another moody", but in the week prior to recording Red Fripp had discovered the works of mystic John G. Bennett and decided to take "a year's sabbatical ... at Bennett's Institute". Fripp offered the idea of McDonald rejoining the band in his absence to EG. When this idea was met with lack of interest, Fripp abruptly disbanded King Crimson on 24 September 1974, and Red was released two weeks later.

 Writing 
Much of the material on Red has origins in improvisation. Motifs that would eventually be used for "Fallen Angel" were first played by Fripp in 1972 as part of improvs performed with the quintet line-up that recorded Larks' Tongues in Aspic. These improvisations are documented as "Fallen Angel" and "Fallen Angel Hullabaloo" on the Larks' Tongues in Aspic: The Complete Recordings box set, as well as standalone releases of their respective concerts. The distinctive introduction to "One More Red Nightmare" was deployed by Wetton and Fripp in various improvs throughout 1974, which can be heard in the Starless and The Road to Red box sets. Lastly, "Providence" itself was an improv, taken from the group's show on 30 June 1974 in Providence, Rhode Island. It was released in its uncut form on several releases, such as The Great Deceiver box set and the 40th anniversary edition of Red itself.

"Red" was composed solely by Fripp. In an analysis of the piece by composer Andrew Keeling, he describes "Red" as "an instrumental piece scored for electric guitar (multi-tracked in three layers), bass guitar and drums," as well as "one of the more muscular pieces of Robert Fripp's, in particular the deployment of open strings and heavily attacked and syncopated bass and drums." In an online diary from 2012, Fripp wrote about its development: "A motif; moved from [the missing piece] "Blue" to "Red": the opening and closing theme of "Red" itself. The driving, relentless figure that follows it, and the middle figure played by the basses, weren't enough for a complete piece." Once the track was put down Fripp recalled: "We played it back and Bill said, 'I don't get it, but if you tell me it's good, I trust you.' ... I said, 'We don't have to use it.' John was in no doubt: 'We'll use it.'" An unused variation of the song's middle section would later emerge in the writing rehearsals for Three of a Perfect Pair (1984). Though it went unused, it finally saw light as the middle section of the instrumental "VROOOM VROOOM" on THRAK (1995).

"Starless" was originally written by Wetton, with the intent of it being the title track for Starless and Bible Black. At the time, the piece consisted only of the vocal section of the song, and Wetton claims that it got a "cold reception" from Fripp and Bruford. Later, an introductory theme was devised by Fripp and performed on violin by Cross, and two additional sections were added after the vocal, one being contributed by Bruford. The final section reprises various themes heard earlier in the song, and it also reuses a bass part which was originally written for "Fracture" on Starless and Bible Black. This early arrangement of "Fracture" can be heard on the Starless box set, as well as the standalone releases of their respective concerts. The lyrics went through several iterations, with one early verse later included by Wetton in "Caesar's Palace Blues", a song he would perform with U.K. Since the title "Starless and Bible Black" was already used for an improvisation on the group's previous album, the song's title was shortened to "Starless". On Red, "Starless" is credited to the quartet, as well as lyricist Richard Palmer-James.

Packaging
During the mixing stage, ideas for the album's title and artwork were discussed. The needles on the VU meters on the studio's mixing desk were observed to be "bouncing and crashing sharply into the red". For Wetton, this symbolised where the direction of the band's music was heading and, for a while, was to influence the front cover of Red. However, EG had the album's marketing potential in mind, and suggested a group photograph was easier to sell, particularly for the American market. EG director Mark Fenwick pitched to hire John Kosh, who subsequently commissioned Gered Mankowitz to produce photographs of the VU meters and the group, but the difficult group relations at the time led to the decision to photograph each member alone and form a composite to appear as if they are standing together. The severe shadowing has drawn comparisons to the front of With the Beatles (1963). Fripp recalled: "I loathed the session and was ill at ease with all of it."

The lyrics to the three songs on the album were not originally included as part of the packaging for the album, unlike all previous Crimson studio albums, which had lyrics printed either on the inside of the gatefold covers or on the custom inner sleeves. The first printing of the lyrics would occur 26 years after the album's initial release, on the 30th anniversary edition released in 2000.

Release and reception

Released in October 1974, Red spent only one week on the British charts, at No. 45, whereas all the band's previous studio albums had reached the top 30. In the United States, it reached No. 66 on the Billboard 200. However, it remained a popular album with fans and critics.

At the time of release, Sounds reporter Steve Peacock believed the group's disbanding was merely a marketing ploy to boost album sales. Retrospective reviews were resoundingly positive. In theirs, AllMusic declared Red to be weaker than its two predecessors, but nonetheless a superlative work: "few intact groups could have gotten an album as good as Red together. The fact that it was put together by a band in its death throes makes it all the more impressive an achievement." Robert Christgau also applauded the album, having been generally critical of the group's past work, calling it "Grand, powerful, grating, and surprisingly lyrical" and commenting that "this does for classical-rock fusion what John McLaughlin's Devotion did for jazz-rock fusion." Greg Kot of The Chicago Tribune praised Red as "progressive rock's finest hour." Classic Rock reviewer considered Red "a walk down a lightless corridor and an unhappy and ferocious counterbalance to the frolics of King Crimson's beginnings", and described it as "dark, brooding and laden with heavily distorted sections and a decidedly melancholic vibe".

Like most of King Crimson's catalogue, Red has been re-released numerous times since 1974. First issued on Compact Disc in 1986, it has also been released as part of the "Definitive Edition" series in 1989, and the "30th Anniversary Edition" series in 1999. In 2009, Red was chosen, alongside In the Court of the Crimson King and Lizard, to launch the "40th Anniversary Edition" series. As part of this series, each album is presented in a CD/DVD-A package, with new stereo and 5.1 surround mixes crafted by Steven Wilson. Unlike the other editions in the series, however, Red launched with no new stereo mix. In 2013, Wilson and Fripp created a new stereo mix for The Road To Red boxed set, and this mix was also issued separately as part of a 2CD package.

Legacy
In 2001, Q magazine named Red as one of the "50 Heaviest Albums of All Time" and Pitchfork ranked Red number 72 in its "Top 100 Albums of the 1970s" list, stating that "For a band that was very obviously about to splinter, King Crimson's music sounds remarkably of a single mind. On Red, they achieved a remarkable balance between bone-crushing brutality and cerebral complexity." Rolling Stone ranked the album at number 15 on their list of the 50 best progressive rock albums of all time.

"Red" was also ranked as the twentieth best progressive rock song of all time by PopMatters, as well as number 87 in Rolling Stones list of "The 100 Greatest Guitar Songs". Red has been regarded as being highly influential to the development of avant-garde metal and math rock. Nirvana frontman Kurt Cobain said that Red influenced the sound of their album In Utero.

Musicologists Eric Tamm and Edward Macan both consider Red, particularly the track "Starless", to be the highlight of King Crimson's recorded output. "Starless" is played over the opening titles of the 2018 horror film Mandy.

Track listing

PersonnelKing CrimsonRobert Fripp – electric guitar , acoustic guitar , Mellotron , Hohner pianet 
John Wetton – bass , vocals 
Bill Bruford (credited as William Bruford) – drums , percussion Additional personnelDavid Cross – violin , Mellotron
Mel Collins – soprano saxophone 
Ian McDonald – alto saxophone 
Mark Charig – cornet 
Robin Miller – oboe  
uncredited – cello , double bass ProductionKing Crimson – production, arrangements
George Chkiantz – recording, engineering
Rod Thear – recording, assistant engineering
Chris, Tex, Harvey and Peter Walmsley – equipment
John Kosh – cover
Gered Mankowitz – photography

Charts

ReferencesNotesCitationsBibliography'

Further reading
 Keeling, Andrew (2007). King Crimson: Red: An Analysis by Andrew Keeling.

External links 
 

King Crimson albums
1974 albums
Albums produced by Robert Fripp
Island Records albums
Atlantic Records albums
Polydor Records albums
E.G. Records albums
Virgin Records albums
Albums recorded at Olympic Sound Studios